Evan DePaul (born January 7, 1996) is a retired Canadian sailor in the 49er class with partner William Jones.

Career
He began sailing in 2010 in the 420 class boats at the Hamilton Yacht Club, and switched to the 49erFX class in 2015, when he teamed up with Will Jones. They later switched to the 49er class.

In 2017, DePaul and Jones won gold at the World Junior Sailing Championships in the 49er class.

In March 2021, DePaul was named to Canada's 2020 Olympic team with his partner William Jones, by being ranked as the top Canadian boat at the 2020 World Championships. DePaull and Jones finished 19th in Tokyo.

DePaul announced his retirement from competitive sailing October 27, 2022.

References

External links
 
 
 
 

Living people
1996 births
Canadian male sailors (sport)
Sportspeople from Burlington, Ontario
Sailors at the 2020 Summer Olympics – 49er